The Moore-Webb-Holmes Plantation is a historic active plantation on Alabama State Route 14 near Marion, Perry County, Alabama. Although the main house burned in 1927, the outbuildings, barns, cook house and other buildings remain intact and preserved. It continues to operate as a working farm and has been continuously owned by descendants of the original owner. It was added to the National Register of Historic Places on August 24, 2011.

References

National Register of Historic Places in Perry County, Alabama
Plantations in Alabama
Burned houses in the United States